The Hong Kong U23 Football Team is a Hong Kong professional football team managed by the Hong Kong Football Association. Mainly formed by U23 local players, the team currently competes in the Hong Kong Premier League.

History

2021: Establishment
Following the withdrawals of Pegasus and Happy Valley from the 2021–22 HKPL season, the Hong Kong Football Association announced in August 2021 that a new HKPL team mainly formed by U23 local players will be established.

On 2 September 2021, the HKFA confirmed the establishment of HK U23. The team's operation will be maintained for at least three years and no foreign players are allowed to be registered in the team. Meanwhile, the number of overaged players is restricted to five for the team, with no more than three on the pitch during matches. The rest of the players must meet the registration status of U23 local players. 

Ahead of the 2022–23 season, the club announced that they would move across town from Tsing Yi Sports Ground to Tseung Kwan O Sports Ground.

Team staff
{|class="wikitable"
|-
!Position
!Staff
|-
|Head coach||  Szeto Man Chun
|-
|Assistant coach||  Sin Ka Yu
|-
|Goalkeeping coach||  Chan Chun Yu
|-
|Fitness coach||  Cheng Sai Ming

Current squad

 OA

 OA

 OA
 OA
 (on loan from Resources Capital)

 OA

 (on loan from Kitchee)

 (on loan from Rangers)

 (on loan from Rangers)

Remarks:
OA These players are registered as overaged players.

Head coaches
 Cheung Kin Fung (2021–2022)
 Szeto Man Chun (2022–)

See also
 Hong Kong national under-23 football team
 Hong Kong national under-20 football team
 Hong Kong national under-17 football team

References

External links
HKFA

Football clubs in Hong Kong
Hong Kong Premier League
Hong Kong Premier League clubs
2021 establishments in Hong Kong
Association football clubs established in 2021